Eupithecia reginamontium is a moth in the family Geometridae. It is found in Lesotho and South Africa.

References

Moths described in 2000
reginamontium
Moths of Africa